André Jourdain may refer to:
 André Jourdain (bishop)
 André Jourdain (politician)